AStA Advances in Statistical Analysis is a peer-reviewed mathematics journal published quarterly by Springer Science+Business Media and the German Statistical Society. It was established in 2007, and covers statistical theory, methods, methodological developments, as well as probability and mathematics applications. Coverage is organized into three broad areas: statistical applications, statistical methodology, and review articles. The editor were Göran Kauermann (2009–2019) and Stefan Lang (2009–2014). In 2022 the editor are Thomas Kneib and Yarema Okhrin.

Abstracting and indexing 
The journal is abstracted and indexed in:

According to the Journal Citation Reports, the journal has a 2020 impact factor of 1.160.

References

External links 

Mathematics journals
Publications established in 2007
English-language journals
Quarterly journals
Springer Science+Business Media academic journals